Smolna is one of the streets of Warsaw's city centre. It is entirely contained in the Śródmieście district, and runs for approximately 400m, orthogonal to the Vistula river. It is a one-way street, running eastwards from Charles de Gaulle roundabout to Jerusalem Avenue, approximately 1 km west of the river.

See also
Branicki Residential House

References 

Streets in Warsaw